Israel Tentory García (born 25 October 1957) is a Mexican politician affiliated with the Party of the Democratic Revolution. As of 2014 he served as Deputy of the LIX Legislature of the Mexican Congress representing Michoacán.

References

1957 births
Living people
Politicians from Michoacán
Party of the Democratic Revolution politicians
Deputies of the LIX Legislature of Mexico
Members of the Chamber of Deputies (Mexico) for Michoacán